Clayton Failla (born 8 January 1986) is a Maltese professional footballer who plays for Maltese Premier League side Hamrun Spartans F.C., where he plays as a midfielder and occasionally as a defender.

Playing career

St. Patrick
Failla was born in Żabbar, Malta. He began his career with his boyhood team Żabbar St. Patrick as a trainee. In 2001–02 he was promoted to the senior team squad, getting three games as a substitute. He was a first team regular when the team won promotion in 2003–04. He made his Premier Division debut during the 2004–05 season.

Failla showed potential, despite St. Patrick's disappointing season,. In January 2005, Failla moved to Hibernians. During his time with St. Patrick, he made 33 appearances and scored two goals.

Hibernians
Failla continued the second half of the 2004–05 season with Hibernians, and played in their first team squad. Failla helped his new side to a third-place finish in the Maltese Premier League, making 11 appearances and scoring one goal in the process.

Failla began the 2005–06 season as an established member of the first team squad. Hibernians managed their second third-place finish in as many seasons. Failla did however get his hands on his first piece of silverware with Hibernians as the club won the Maltese Cup, after beating Floriana 1–0 in the final. During the season Failla made 23 appearances and scored one goal.

For the 2006–07 season Failla made 22 appearances, but failing to find the net, as the team recorded a fifth-place finish in the Maltese Premier League. Failla did however add to his previous success as Hibernians beat Sliema Wanderers on penalties to retain the Maltese Cup. Failla made 22 appearances and scored twice in the 2007–08 season.

In the 2008–09 season, Hibernians won the Maltese Premier League for the first time in seven years, after beating Valletta to the top table finish by one point. During the season Failla made 27 appearances, scored seven goals and provided 11 assists. He was chosen as Man of the Match nine times during the season, most for any Premier Division player. Failla also added to his honours the Maltese Player of the Year award.

Sliema Wanderers
On 17 June 2009, Failla made the move from Hibernians to Sliema Wanderers and was allocated the number 77 shirt. He made his Premier League debut for Sliema Wanderers on 30 August 2009 in a 1–0 defeat to Qormi, he played 77 minutes of the match, before been substituted for Matthew Bartolo.

Failla scored his first Premier League goal for Sliema Wanderers on 17 October 2009, when he scored the third goal in a 5–0 victory over Ħamrun Spartans.

Hibernians
On 9 August 2011, Failla returned to his former club Hibernians, for the 2011–12 season of the Maltese Premier League. Failla had a trial with Hull City of England, playing for the team in a summer tournament. Failla is also the current captain of Hibernians.

Floriana
On 28 May 2017, Clayton was officially announced as a signing for the Maltese Premier League Club Floriana. Failla thanked Hibernians for the past experience with the Paolites whilst looking forward for his experience with the Greens.

International career
Failla is also an international player for the Malta national football team. He made his international debut in 2008. He is usually played in defence but is sometimes played in the midfield.
In 2014, in a friendly match Malta against Slovakia, he became a famous meme, because the system sound of the stadium played Numb, from Linkin Park, instead of Malta National Anthem and the cameras got him laughing with the music.

Career statistics

International goals

Honours

Club
Hibernians
 Maltese Premier League: 2008–09, 2014–15
 Maltese FA Trophy: 2006–07, 2007–08, 2012–13, 2013–14

Individual
 Maltese Player of the Year: 2008–09, 2011–12

External links
 
 

Living people
1986 births
People from Żabbar
Association football midfielders
Association football defenders
Maltese footballers
Malta international footballers
St. Patrick F.C. players
Hibernians F.C. players
Sliema Wanderers F.C. players
Floriana F.C. players
Birkirkara F.C. players
Ħamrun Spartans F.C. players
Maltese Premier League players
Competitors at the 2005 Mediterranean Games
Mediterranean Games competitors for Malta